Béranger Itoua (born 9 May 1992 in Congo) is a Congolese professional footballer who plays for Sohar SC in the Oman Professional League.

Orlando Pirates

Trialing with the South African outfit in July 2013, Itoua penned a deal with the Bucs ten days later. However, the transfer information was never corroborated and officials of the club denied any news stating that Itoua was actually signed. The defender then trained with their squad but was never officially registered with the league.

On 14 August 2019 it was confirmed, that Itoua had joined Sohar SC.

References

1992 births
Living people
Association football defenders
Republic of the Congo footballers
Republic of the Congo expatriate footballers
Republic of the Congo international footballers
CSMD Diables Noirs players
Orlando Pirates F.C. players
CARA Brazzaville players
AS Otôho players
Al-Shoulla FC players
Sohar SC players
Saudi First Division League players
Republic of the Congo expatriate sportspeople in Saudi Arabia
Republic of the Congo expatriate sportspeople in South Africa
Republic of the Congo expatriate sportspeople in Oman
Expatriate footballers in Saudi Arabia
Expatriate soccer players in South Africa
Expatriate footballers in Oman
Republic of the Congo A' international footballers
2018 African Nations Championship players